WZTS-LD, virtual and UHF digital channel 16, is a low-powered  Cozi TV affiliated television station licensed to Summersville, West Virginia, United States. The station is owned by TTV, LLC.

Digital channels 
The station's digital signal is multiplexed:

References

External links
Station website

Cozi TV affiliates
Low-power television stations in the United States
Independent television stations in the United States
ZTS-LD